Aifric Mac Aodha (born 1979) is an Irish poet and writer. Working mainly in the Irish language, she is an editor with An Gúm.

Biography
A native of Dublin, Mac Aodha first book, Gabháil Syrinx was published in 2010. She has edited Comhar, The Stinging Fly and Poetry Ireland's Trumpet. She works as an assistant editor with An Gúm.

External links
 https://portraidi.ie/en/aifric-mac-aodha/
 https://www.gallerypress.com/authors/m-to-n/aifric-mac-aodha/
 https://web.archive.org/web/20180810210356/https://www.poetryinternationalweb.net/pi/site/poet/item/19748/30/Aifric-Mac-Aodha
 https://stingingfly.org/author/aifric-mac-aodha/
 Theinová, Daniela. “Original in Translation: The Poetry of Aifric Mac Aodha”. In Post-Ireland? Essays on Contemporary Irish Poetry, Jefferson Holdridge and Brian O’Conchubhair eds. (Winston-Salem NC: Wake Forest University Press, 2017).

Date of birth missing (living people)
Living people
1979 births
Irish-language poets
Irish women poets
21st-century Irish people
People from County Dublin